Midnapore Art College,  is a general degree art college founded in 2001. It is located in Midnapore, West Bengal, India. This is the only college which offers the Bachelor of Fine Arts ( B.F.A) degree in whole south Bengal.
Universities and colleges in Paschim Medinipur district
2001 establishments in West Bengal
Educational institutions established in 2001

Admission for the Bachelor of Fine Art (B.F.A) degree is on going. Contact- 9564495514(Ajit Kumar Bag). call time official hours only.